John Wilson Higgins (27 January 1930 – 21 June 2017) was a Scottish professional footballer, who played as a defender. Born in Kilmarnock, Higgins began his football career with Edinburgh club Hibernian. He played for Hibs in the 1955–56 European Cup, as part of the first British club to enter European competition. Higgins then played for St Mirren for two seasons between 1957 and 1959. He was part of the St Mirren squad when they won the 1958–59 Scottish Cup, but he missed the final after contracting a viral infection. Higgins then played in the Football League for Swindon Town between 1959 and 1961.

Higgins died in June 2017, aged 87, after battling Alzheimer's disease.

References

External links
 
 Fitbastats.com

1930 births
2017 deaths
Footballers from Kilmarnock
Scottish footballers
Association football fullbacks
Hibernian F.C. players
St Mirren F.C. players
Swindon Town F.C. players
Scottish Football League players
English Football League players
Deaths from dementia in Scotland
Deaths from Alzheimer's disease
Place of death missing